Marc Andrieu (born 19 September 1959, in Carmaux) is a former French rugby union player and coach. He played as a wing and as a centre.

Club career
Andrieu first played for US Carmaux, since 1974/75, reaching the first team in 1977/78. He moved to AS Béziers in 1979/80, where he would stay until 1982/83. He won three titles of the Top 14, in 1979/80, 1980/81 and 1982/83. He was runners-up of the Challenge Yves du Manoir twice, in 1980 and 1981. He moved afterwards to RC Nîmes, where he played from 1983/84 to 1992/93, when he finished his career.

International career
Andrieu had 26 caps for France from 1986 to 1990, scoring 6 tries, 24 points on aggregate. He played at the Five Nations Championship in 1988, 1989, and 1990. He won the tournament twice, in 1988, ex-aequo with Wales, and 1989. 

He was called for the 1987 Rugby World Cup, playing in two games and scoring a try.

Coach career
He became a coach at RC Nîmes after finishing his career there. He later became sports director.

References

External links
Marc Andrieu International Statistics

1959 births
Living people
French rugby union players
France international rugby union players
French rugby union coaches
Rugby union wings
Rugby union centres
Sportspeople from Tarn (department)
AS Béziers Hérault players